Anthozoan Mountain is a mountain in the Slate Range of Alberta, Canada. Named in 1925, fossilized anthozoans (i.e. coral) are found in the Devonian limestone of the mountain.

References

Two-thousanders of Alberta
Alberta's Rockies